McKendree Long (1888 — 1976) was an American minister and painter.

Life 
Educated at Horner Military Academy in Oxford and at Davidson College, he went on to attend classes at the Art Students League in New York. Upon winning a scholarship for study in Europe, he travelled there, learning an academic style of portrait painting. He returned to the United States, working as a professional portraitist in New York City and North Carolina. Long went on to serve in World War I, and abandoned his artistic career afterwards, being ordained as a Presbyterian minister in 1922, becoming an evangelist in the southern U.S. In his seventies, Reverend Long began painting again, in a far more surrealistic fashion that widely differed from the style of his previous portraiture.

Grandson Ben Long (1945- ) is also an alumnus of the Art Students League in New York.  Ben Long has gained substantial international notoriety, particularly for his drawings and fresco work.

Archival collections 

The Presbyterian Historical Society in Philadelphia, Pennsylvania, has McKendree Robbins Long's Papers, including written and printed materials; original drawings, sketches, and illustrations; a folder of photographs; and seven sermons recorded on Duodisc electric transcription discs. Long embellished a portion of his handwritten work with imaginative illustrations and/or illumination, making this collection, and Long, particularly unique.

References

External links
Article from Davidson Journal with several examples of his work
Facebook fanpage with images

1888 births
1976 deaths
American portrait painters
Davidson College alumni
Art Students League of New York alumni
American military personnel of World War I
American Presbyterian ministers
Painters from North Carolina
20th-century American painters
American male painters
Religious leaders from North Carolina
20th-century American male artists